Larvik/Sandefjord Region is a metropolitan region in the county of Vestfold in southeastern Norway. It is centered on the cities of Larvik and Sandefjord.

1/ km²2/ Population per km²

External links
Official website in Norwegian
Sandefjord Travel Association in English

Metropolitan regions of Norway